François-Philippe Brais,  (October 18, 1894 – January 2, 1972) was a Canadian lawyer and politician.

Born in Montreal, the son of Émilien Brais and Blanche Brunet, he studied at McGill University. He was called to the Quebec Bar in 1917 and began a legal career in private practice, specialising in insurance law. From 1922 to 1930 he a Crown prosecutor in Montreal, being appointed King's Counsel in 1927.  He appeared several times in the Supreme Court of Canada.  He eventually served on many corporate boards, including the board of the Canadian Pacific Railway and Sun Life Insurance.  He also served on the boards of  many non-profit and charitable organizations, such as the Montreal Children's Hospital.

In 1940, Brais was appointed to the Legislative Council of Quebec representing the Grandville division. He served until the Council was abolished in 1968. In 1940, he was made a Minister without Portfolio in the cabinet of Liberal Premier of Quebec Adélard Godbout.

Brais was President of the Canadian Bar Association from 1944 until 1945.  He then served as bâtonnier of the Montreal Bar in 1949, and bâtonnier of the provincial Barreau, 1949–1950.

In 1943, Brais was made a Commander of the Order of the British Empire. In 1945 the Université de Montréal awarded him a doctorate in law, honoris causa.  In 1953, the Université Laval awarded him a second honorary doctorate in law. In 1970, he was made a Companion of the Order of Canada.

Brais died on January 2, 1972, at Cowansville.  He was buried on January 5, 1972, at Notre-Dame-des-Neiges Cemetery in Montreal.

See also

References

1894 births
1972 deaths
McGill University alumni
Lawyers in Quebec
Canadian King's Counsel
Canadian Bar Association Presidents
Quebec Liberal Party MLCs
Members of the Executive Council of Quebec
Canadian Commanders of the Order of the British Empire
Companions of the Order of Canada
Burials at Notre Dame des Neiges Cemetery